Preah Vihear Temple (Khmer: ប្រាសាទព្រះវិហារ Prasat Preah Vihear) is an ancient Khmer temple built during the period of the Khmer Empire, that is situated on the top of a  cliff in the Dângrêk Mountains, in the Preah Vihear province, Cambodia. In 1962, following a lengthy dispute between Cambodia and Thailand over ownership, the International Court of Justice (ICJ) in The Hague ruled that the temple is in Cambodia.

Affording a view for many kilometers across a plain, Prasat Preah Vihear has the most spectacular setting of all the temples built during the six-century-long Khmer Empire. As a key edifice of the empire's spiritual life, it was supported and modified by successive kings and so bears elements of several architectural styles. Preah Vihear is unusual among Khmer temples in being constructed along a long north–south axis, rather than having the conventional rectangular plan with orientation toward the east. The temple gives its name to Cambodia's Preah Vihear province, in which it is now located, as well as the Khao Phra Wihan National Park which borders it in Thailand's Sisaket province, though it is no longer accessible from Thailand. On 7 July, 2008, Preah Vihear was listed as a UNESCO World Heritage Site.

Location 
The temple was built at the top of Poy Tadi, a steep cliff in the Dângrêk Mountain range which is the natural border between Cambodia and Thailand.
The Temple is currently listed by Cambodia as being in Svay Chrum Village, Kan Tout Commune, in Choam Khsant District of Preah Vihear Province of northern Cambodia. The temple is 140 km from Angkor Wat and 418 km from Phnom Penh.

The Temple was listed by Thailand as being in Bhumsrol village of Bueng Malu sub-district (now merged with Sao Thong Chai sub-district), in Kantharalak district of the Sisaket Province of eastern Thailand. It is 110 km from the Mueang Sisaket District, the center of Sisaket Province.
In 1962 the ICJ ruled that only the temple building belonged to Cambodia, while the direct way to access the temple was from Thailand, but currently, as of at least 2015, the only access is from inside Cambodia.

The site 
The temple complex runs  along a north–south axis facing the plains to the north, from which it is now cut off by the international border. Although this structure is very different from the temple mountains found at Angkor, it serves the same purpose as a stylised representation of Mount Meru, the home of the gods.
The approach to the sanctuary is punctuated by five gopuras (these are conventionally numbered from the sanctuary outwards, so gopura five is the first to be reached by visitors). Each of the gopuras before the courtyards is reached by a set of steps, and so marks a change in height which increases their impact. The gopuras also block a visitor's view of the next part of the temple until they pass through the gateway, making it impossible to see the complex as a whole from any one point.
The fifth gopura, in the Koh Ker style, retains traces of the red paint with which it was once decorated, although the tiled roof has now disappeared.  The fourth gopura is later, from the Khleang/Baphuon periods, and has on its southern outer pediment, "one of the masterpieces of Preah Vihear" (Freeman, p. 162) : a depiction of the Churning of the Sea of Milk.  The third is the largest and is also flanked by two halls.  The sanctuary is reached via two successive courtyards, in the outer of which are two libraries.

Nomenclature 
Prasat Preah Vihear is the compound of words Prasat, Preah and Vihear, which mean the "religious offering of sacred shrine". In Sanskrit, Prasat (प्रसाद) (ប្រាសាទ) means "religious offering" which could even be taken as synonym of "temple" in this context, Preah (ព្រះ) mean "sacred" or "beloved", and "Vihear" (វិហារ) from the Sanskrit word Vihara (विहार) means "abode" or "shrine" (the central structure of the temple). In Khmer, "phnom" (ភ្នំ) means mountain, and Cambodians occasionally refer to it as "Phnom Preah Vihear" (ភ្នំព្រះវិហារ). These versions of the name carry significant political and national connotations (see below: New dispute over ownership).

History

Ancient history 
Construction of the first temple on the site began in the early ninth century; both then and in the following centuries it was dedicated to the Hindu god Shiva in his manifestations as the mountain gods Sikharesvara and Bhadresvara. The earliest surviving parts of the temple, however, date from the Koh Ker period in the early tenth century, when the empire's capital was at the city of that name. Today, elements of the Banteay Srei style of the late tenth century can be seen, but most of the temple was constructed during the reigns of the Khmer kings Suryavarman I (1006–1050) and Suryavarman II (1113–1150). An inscription found at the temple provides a detailed account of Suryavarman II studying sacred rituals, celebrating religious festivals and making gifts, including white parasols, golden bowls and elephants, to his spiritual advisor, the aged Brahmin Divakarapandita. The Brahmin himself took an interest in the temple, according to the inscription, donating to it a golden statue of a dancing Shiva known as Nataraja. In the wake of the decline of Hinduism in the region the site was converted to use by Buddhists.

Modern history and ownership dispute 
In modern times, Prasat Preah Vihear was rediscovered by the outside world and became subject of an emotional dispute between Thailand and the newly independent Cambodia. The dispute arose from the different maps each party used in national delimitation. In 1904, Siam and the French colonial authorities ruling Cambodia formed a joint commission to demarcate their mutual border to largely follow the watershed line of the Dângrêk mountain range, which placed nearly all of Preah Vihear temple on Thailand's side. France, who was the protector of Cambodia at the time, agreed with Siam in Franco-Siamese boundary treaty of 1904. The Mixed Commission was set up in 1905, and it was to carry out delimitation between Siam and Cambodia. In 1907, after survey work, French officers drew up a map to show the border's location. Cambodia used the map published by French geographers in 1907 (called "Annex I map") which showed the Temple in Cambodian territory. While Thailand used the provisions of the treaty of 1904 which reads:"The frontier between Siam and Cambodia starts, on the left shore of the Great Lake, from the mouth of the river Stung Roluos, it follows the parallel from that point easterly direction until it meets the river Prek Kompong Tiam, then, turning northwards, it merges with the meridian from that meeting-point as far as the Pnom Dang Rek mountain chain. From there it follows the watershed between the basins of Nam Sen and the Mekong, on the one hand, and the Nam Moun, on the other hand, and joins the Pnom Padang chain the crest of which it follows eastwards as far as the Mekong. Upstream from that point, the Mekong remains the frontier of the Kingdom of Siam, in accordance with Article 1 of the Treaty of 3 October 1893."This would deem the temple as being located within Thai territory.

However, the resulting topographic map, which was sent to Siamese authorities and used in the 1962 International Court of Justice (ICJ) ruling, showed the line deviating slightly from the watershed without explanation in the Preah Vihear area, placing all of the temples on the Cambodian side.

Following the withdrawal of French troops from Cambodia in 1954, Thai forces occupied the temple to enforce their claim. Cambodia protested and in 1959 asked the ICJ to rule that the temple and the surrounding land lay in Cambodian territory. The case became a volatile political issue in both countries. Diplomatic relations were severed, and threats of force were voiced by both governments.

The court proceedings focused not on questions of cultural heritage or on which state was the successor to the Khmer Empire, but rather on Siam's supposed long-time acceptance of the 1907 map.
Arguing in The Hague for Cambodia was former U.S. Secretary of State Dean Acheson, while Thailand's legal team included a former British attorney general, Sir Frank Soskice. Cambodia contended the map showing the temple as being on Cambodian soil was the authoritative document. Thailand argued that the map was invalid and that it was not an official document of the border commission, and that it clearly violated the commission's working principle that the border would follow the watershed line, which would place most of the temple in Thailand. If Thailand had not protested the map earlier, the Thai side said, it was because Thai authorities had had actual possession of the temple for some period of time, due to the great difficulty of scaling the steep hillside from the Cambodian side, or simply had not understood that the map was wrong.

ICJ's judgement 
On 15 June 1962, the court ruled 9 to 3 that the temple belonged to Cambodia and Thailand was obliged to withdraw all stationed troops there and, by a vote of 7 to 5, that Thailand must return any antiquities such as sculptures that it had removed from the temple. The Annex I map did not bind both parties because it was not the work of the Mixed Commission per the treaty. However, both parties adopted the map and the demarcation line in it, therefore had a binding character. In its decision, the court noted that in over the five decades after the map was drawn, the Siamese/Thai authorities had not objected in various international forums to its depiction of the temple's location. Nor did they object when a French colonial official received the Siamese scholar and government figure Prince Damrong at the temple in 1930 (possibly before the Thais realised the map was wrong). Under the legal principle Qui tacet consentire videtur si loqui debuisset ac potuisset ("he who is silent is taken to agree"), the court ruled that Thailand had accepted and benefited from other parts of the border treaty. With these and other acts, it said, Thailand had accepted the map and therefore Cambodia was the owner of the temple.

Australian judge Sir Percy Spender wrote a scathing dissent for the minority on the court, however, pointing out that the French government had never mentioned Thai "acquiescence" or acceptance at any time, not even when Thailand stationed military observers at the temple in 1949. On the contrary, France always insisted that their map was correct and the temple was located on their side of the natural watershed (which it clearly is not). Thailand had modified its own maps, which in Spender's opinion was sufficient without having to protest to France. Spender said:

Thailand reacted angrily. It announced it would boycott meetings of the Southeast Asia Treaty Organization, with Thai officials saying this step was to protest a U.S. bias toward Cambodia in the dispute. As evidence, Thai officials cited Acheson's role as Cambodia's advocate; the U.S. government replied that Acheson was merely acting as a private attorney, engaged by Cambodia. Mass demonstrations were staged in Thailand protesting the ruling.
Thailand eventually backed down and agreed to turn the site over to Cambodia. Rather than lower the Thai national flag that had been flying at the temple, Thai soldiers dug up and removed the pole with it still flying. The pole was erected at nearby Mor I Daeng cliff, where it is still in use. In January 1963, Cambodia formally took possession of the site in a ceremony attended by around 1,000 people, many of whom had made the arduous climb up the cliff from the Cambodian side. Prince Sihanouk, Cambodia's leader, walked up the cliff in less than an hour, then made offerings to Buddhist monks. He made a gesture of conciliation in the ceremony, announcing that all Thais would be able to visit the temple without visas, and that Thailand was free to keep any antiquities it may have taken away from the site.

Civil war 

Civil war began in Cambodia in 1970; the temple's location high on top of a cliff meant it was a readily defensible militarily. Soldiers loyal to the Lon Nol government in Phnom Penh continued to hold it long after the plain below fell to communist forces. Tourists were able to visit from the Thai side during the war.

Even though the Khmer Rouge captured Phnom Penh in April 1975, the Khmer National Armed Forces soldiers at Preah Vihear continued to hold out after the collapse of the Khmer Republic government. The Khmer Rouge made several unsuccessful attempts to capture the temple, then finally succeeded on 22 May 1975 by shelling the cliff, scaling it and routing the defenders, Thai officials reported at the time. The defenders simply stepped across the border and surrendered to Thai authorities. It was said to be the last place in Cambodia to fall to the Khmer Rouge.

Full-scale war began again in Cambodia in December 1978 when the Vietnamese army invaded to overthrow the Khmer Rouge. Khmer Rouge troops retreated to border areas. In January, the Vietnamese reportedly attacked Khmer Rouge troops holed up in the temple, but there were no reports of damage to it. Large numbers of Cambodian refugees entered Thailand after the invasion. Guerrilla warfare continued in Cambodia through the 1980s and well into the 1990s, hampering access to Preah Vihear. The temple opened briefly to the public in 1992, only to be re-occupied the following year by Khmer Rouge fighters. In December 1998, the temple was the scene of negotiations by which several hundred Khmer Rouge soldiers, said to be the guerrilla movement's last significant force, agreed to surrender to the Phnom Penh government.

The temple opened again to visitors from the Thai side at the end of 1998; Cambodia completed the construction of a long-awaited access road up the cliff in 2003.

Expulsion of Cambodian refugees 
 
On 12 June 1979, the government of General Kriangsak Chomanan, who had come to power in Thailand by a military coup, informed foreign embassies in Bangkok that it was going to expel a large number of Cambodian refugees. He would allow the governments of the United States, France and Australia to select 1,200 of the refugees to resettle in their countries. Lionel Rosenblatt, Refugee Coordinator of the American Embassy, Yvette Pierpaoli, a French businesswoman in Bangkok, and representatives of the Australian and French governments rushed to the border to select the refugees that night. In three frantic hours the foreigners picked out 1,200 refugees for resettlement from among the thousands being held by Thai soldiers behind barbed wire in a Buddhist temple at Wat Ko Refugee Camp and loaded them on buses to go to Bangkok. The remaining refugees were then loaded on buses and sent away, their destination unknown. It later became known that Cambodian refugees had been collected from many locations and sent to Preah Vihear. An American Embassy official stood beneath a tree along a dirt road leading to the temple, counted the buses, and estimated that about 42,000 Cambodians were taken to Preah Vihear.

Preah Vihear is situated at the top of a 2,000 foot high escarpment overlooking the Cambodian plains far below. The refugees were unloaded from the buses and pushed down the steep escarpment. “There was no path to follow,” one said. “The way that we had to go down was only a cliff. Some people hid on top of the mountain and survived. Others were shot or pushed over the cliff. Most of the people began to climb down using vines as ropes. They tied their children on their backs and strapped them across their chests. As the people climbed down, the soldiers threw big rocks over the cliff.”
At the foot of the cliffs were minefields, placed by the Khmer Rouge during their rule in Cambodia. The refugees followed a narrow path, the safe route indicated by the bodies of those who had set off land mines. They used the bodies as stepping stones to cross the three miles of mined land to reach the Vietnamese soldiers, occupiers of Cambodia, on the other side.

The United Nations High Commissioner for Refugees later estimated that as many as 3,000 Cambodians had died in the push-back and another 7,000 were unaccounted for. General Kriangsak's objective in this brutal operation apparently was to demonstrate to the international community that his government would not bear alone the burden of hundreds of thousands of Cambodian refugees. If so, it worked. For the next dozen years the UN and Western countries would pay for the upkeep of Cambodian refugees in Thailand, resettling thousands in other countries, and devising means by which Cambodians could return safely to their own country.

World Heritage Site 

On 8 July 2008, the World Heritage Committee decided to add Prasat Preah Vihear, along with 26 other sites, to the World Heritage Site list, despite several protests from Thailand, since the map implied Cambodian ownership of disputed land next to the temple.
As the process of Heritage-listing began, Cambodia announced its intention to apply for World Heritage inscription by UNESCO. Thailand protested that it should be a joint-effort and UNESCO deferred debate at its 2007 meeting.
Following this, both Cambodia and Thailand were in full agreement that Preah Vihear Temple had "Outstanding Universal Value" and should be inscribed on the World Heritage List as soon as possible. The two nations agreed that Cambodia should propose the site for formal inscription on the World Heritage List at the 32nd session of the World Heritage Committee in 2008 with the active support of Thailand. This led to a redrawing of the map of the area for proposed inscription, leaving only the temple and its immediate environs.
However, Thailand's political opposition launched an attack on this revised plan (see Modern History and Ownership Dispute), claiming the inclusion of Preah Vihear could nevertheless "consume" the overlapping disputed area near the temple. In response to the political pressure at home, the Thai government withdrew its formal support for the listing of Preah Vihear Temple as a World Heritage site.
Cambodia continued with the application for World Heritage status and, despite official Thai protests, on 7 July 2008, Preah Vihear Temple was inscribed on the list of World Heritage sites.

 Prior to the listing, Cambodia considered Preah Vihear to be part of a Protected Landscape (IUCN category V), defined as "Nationally significant natural and semi-natural landscapes which must be maintained to provide opportunities for recreation." However, Category V is generally defined as "Land, with coast and seas as appropriate, where the interaction of people and nature over time has produced an area of distinct character with significant aesthetic, cultural and/or ecological value, and often with high biological diversity. Safeguarding the integrity of this traditional interaction is vital to the protection, maintenance and evolution of such an area."

A tour that takes tourists camping on temple sites, crossing the border into Thailand issues a warning on the possibility of a 're-routing' of the itinerary.

During the People's Alliance for Democracy's seizure of Suvarnabhumi Airport, future Thai Foreign Minister Kasit Piromya reportedly called Cambodian Prime Minister in a 2008 television interview "crazy" and a nak leng (commonly translated as "gangster").

In 1994, Thailand held a World Heritage proposal conference in Srisaket in which local cultural traditions were considered along with monuments such as Preah Vihear that stimulate more nationalistic sentiments. The use of passes in the Dongrak Mountains reportedly tied together cultural communities and practices divided by a militarized (and imperfectly demarcated) modern border line. A Mon-Khmer ethnic minority, the Kui or Suay (the ethnonyms have multiple spellings), used the passes to hunt and capture elephants in the forests below the Dongrak cliff edge, including the Kulen area which is now a Cambodian wildlife sanctuary. Kui in Cambodia were skilled ironsmiths using ore from Phnom Dek.
While elephant hunting in the vicinity of Preah Vihear was touched upon in the International Court of Justice proceedings,  One international law professor has urged that practicality calls for laying aside exclusive sovereignty in favour of an "international peace park." A scholarly article concurs in concluding: "Since Thailand and Cambodia have brought only blood and bitterness to this place, it might be desirable to preserve it from both. It could be given back to nature and the indigenous peoples, to be managed cooperatively between the two governments in equal partnership with local communities, as a transborder Protected Landscape-Anthropological Reserve (IUCN category V and old category VII)." Given the massing troops in 2008,

Disputes over ownership since 2008 

The conflict between Cambodia and Thailand over land adjoining the site has led to periodic outbreaks of violence.
A military clash occurred in October 2008. In April 2009, 66 stones at the temple allegedly were damaged by Thai soldiers firing across the border. In February 2010, the Cambodian government filed a formal letter of complaint with Google Maps for depicting the natural watershed as the international border instead of the line shown on the 1907 French map used by the International Court of Justice in 1962.

In February 2011, when Thai officials were in Cambodia negotiating the dispute, Thai and Cambodian troops clashed, resulting in injuries and deaths on both sides.  Artillery bombardment in the area occurred during the conflict.  The Cambodian government has claimed that damage occurred to the temple.  However, a UNESCO mission to the site to determine the extent of the damage indicates that the destruction is a result of both Cambodian and Thai gunfire.
Since 4 February, both sides have used artillery against each other, and both blame the other for starting the violence. On 5 February, Cambodia had formally complained in a letter to the U.N. "The recent Thai military actions violate the 1991 Paris Peace Accord, U.N. Charter and a 1962 judgment from the International Court of Justice", the letter claims. On 6 February, the Cambodian government claimed that the temple had been damaged. Cambodia's military commander said: "A wing of our Preah Vihear temple has collapsed as a direct result of the Thai artillery bombardment". However, Thai sources spoke only of minor damage, claiming that Cambodian soldiers had fired from within the temple.
ASEAN, to which both states belong, has offered to mediate over the issue. However, Thailand has insisted that bilateral discussions could better solve the issue. On 5 February, the right-wing People's Alliance for Democracy called for the resignation of Prime Minister Abhisit Vejjajiva for "failing to defend the nation's sovereignty".
A UNESCO World Heritage convention held in Paris in June 2011 determined to accept Cambodia's management proposal for the temple. As a consequence, Thailand withdrew from the event, with the Thai representative explaining, "We withdraw to say we do not accept any decision from this meeting."
Following a February 2011 request from Cambodia for Thai military forces to be ordered out of the area, judges of the ICJ by a vote of 11–5 ordered that both countries immediately withdraw their military forces, and further imposed restrictions on their police forces. The court said this order would not prejudice any final ruling on where the border in the area between Thailand and Cambodia should fall. Abhisit Vejjajiva said that Thai soldiers would not pull out from the disputed area until the military of both countries agree on the mutual withdrawal. "[I]t depends on the two sides to come together and talk," he said, suggesting that an existing joint border committee would be the appropriate place to plan a coordinated pullback. The ICJ ruled on 11 November 2013 that the land adjacent to the temple on the east and west (south being previously agreed as Cambodian, north as Thai) belongs to Cambodia and that any Thai security forces still in that area should leave.

Architecture

Plan at a glance 
Large stairways and long pillared causeway lead to the gopura of the first three levels of the mountain. The gopura are gateways leading into the sanctuary and probably had statues of guardians or minor deities installed in their rooms. The Nāga balustrade between the third and fourth and the top level. There, the galleries and colonnades define areas for religious ceremonies and rituals performed in and around the main shrine containing the sacred linga.

Construction materials 
The gray and yellow sandstone used for the construction of Preah Vihear was available locally.  Wood was used extensively to construct a support for the roof which was covered with terracotta tiles. Bricks, despite their small size, were used instead of large rock slabs to construct the corbelled arches. Bricks were easier to use when building corbelled roofs as they bound together with mortar and were more compact and solid than stone slabs. The sandstone blocks used for the construction of the main tower are exceptionally large, weighing no less than five tons. Several have had holes used for lifting the block drilled in up 24 places.

Elements 
The numbering of the various elements of Khmer temple, its enclosure, courtyards gopura etc., customarily starts from the central sanctuary and works outwards. The gopura nearest the central shrine are given the number 1. In axial temples the last gopura encountered by the visitor will be gopura I and the first, outer gopura the one with the highest number. Here the traditional number is given in brackets. Thus the first gopura encountered is described as the gopura of the first level with its archaeological number given in a brackets( Gopura V). The system is the same one that the archaeologist Parmentier used for his detailed description of Preah Vihear published in 1039.

Inscription 
Several inscriptions have been found at Preah Vihear, the most interesting of which are summarised here.

 K.383 Known as the Stele of Preah Vihear or Stele of the Divakara, this inscription was written in Sanskrit and Khmer probably between 1119 and 1121. It narrates, by order of Suryavarman II, the life of royal guru Divakara and how he served under five Khmer king (Udayadiyavarman II, Harshavarman III, Jayavarman VI, Dharanindravarman I and Suryaman II), who entrusted him with many gifts, both for himself and to be donated on their behalf to temples.   Between the first and second decade of the 12th century, Divakara was asked by Suryavarman II to go on a pilgrimage to the temples to offer gifts, preside over ritual sacrifices and carry out improvements and repair works.  At Preah Vihear temple, Davakara offered precious objects to Shikhareshvara, such as a statue, probably of gold, of the dancing Shiva. He added a gold dais inlaid with precious stones, covered the temple floor with bronze plaques and decorated the walls with plates of precious metal. He ordered that the towers, courts and main entrance be redecorated annually. He also distributed payments to all those who worked at the temple. This inscription is engraved on a stele found inside the mandapa.
 K.380 This inscription appears on both sides of the southern door on the gopura of the fourth level. Written in Sanskrit and Khmer probably between 1038 and 1049, it contains important history about Preah Vihear temple.  It narrates the story of a local personage, Sukarman, who carried out the duties of Recorder in the Sanctuary and keeper of Archives of the Kingdom.  It also tells of a royal decree requiring certain people to swear an oath of allegiance to Shikhareshvara.
 K.381 This inscription was sculpted on the southern doorjamb of the eastern palace's portico on the third level. Written in Sanskrit and Khmer during 1024, it narrates the story of Tapasvindra-pandita, head of a hermitage, who was asked to dispose of presentation in favour of Shikhareshvara, the main god of the temple.
 K.382 This inscription was carved on a pillar and was found badly damaged in front of the central sanctuary and later taken to the National Museum in Bangkok. Inscribed in 1047 it refers to Suryavarman I who commissioned the inscription but contains little information that is important to Preah Vihear temple.

The mountain stairway 
When visitors pass the modern entrance gate they are faced with an impressive and majestic steep stairway. It consists of 163 steps made with large stone slabs, many of which are cut directly into the rock surface. The stairway is 8 meters wide and 78.5 meters long. It was originally flanked by rows of lion statues of which only a few remain, close to the modern entrance gate. In its last 27 meters the stairway narrow to a width of only four meters and is flanked by seven small terraces on either side which were once decorated with the lion statues. The difficulty of climbing the stairway symbolises the laborious path of faith needed to approach the sacred world of the gods.

The Lion Head Reservoir 
Between Gopura IV and III, some 50 meters to the east of the second pillared avenue, there is a square, stone paved reservoir, 9.4 meters on the each side. Each side of the reservoir has 12 steps, each 20 to 25 centimeters high. Near this small reservoir, there is a re-dented, square brick base six meters on each side. It is supposed that this was used as the pedestal for a statue or a small construction made in perishable materials, suggesting a ritual use of this small reservoir. according to previous reports, on the southern side of this pool there was a stone lion's head with a water outlet from its mouth. It was visible only when the water level of the reservoir was very low. This lion spout is no longer at the site. and its where about are not known.

Windows 
In the Preah Vihear complex there is quite a range of window designs. Windows with three or five balusters are common.  Those with seven balusters are found only in the palaces at Gopura III.  The increased number of balusters at the stage establishes the hierarchy of buildings and those who dwelt therein.  Lateral doors are flanked by false windows with balusters.

See also 
 List of World Heritage Sites in Cambodia
 Cambodian–Thai border stand-off
 Khao Phra Wihan National Park

References

Sources 
 Coe, Michael D. (2003). Angkor and the Khmer Civilization.  Thames & Hudson.  .
 Higham, Charles (2001). The Civilization of Angkor. University of California Press. .
 Thompson, Larry Clinton (2010). Refugee Workers in the Indochina Exodus, 1975-1982.  McFarland & Co. 
 Missling, Sven. A Legal View of the Case of the Temple Preah Vihear In: World Heritage Angkor and Beyond: Circumstances and Implications of UNESCO Listings in Cambodia [online]. Göttingen: Göttingen University Press, 2011 (generated 23 May 2020). Available on the Internet: <http://books.openedition.org/gup/307>. .

External links 

 
 UNESCO Official Preah Vihear World Heritage Site Page
 Case Concerning the Temple of Preah Vihear - International Court of Justice
 Temple of Preah Vihear (Cambodia v. Thailand), ICJ overview of the case
 Request for Interpretation of the Judgment of 15 June 1962 in the Case concerning the Temple of Preah Vihear (Cambodia v. Thailand) (Cambodia v. Thailand), another ICJ case.

12th-century Hindu temples
Cambodia–Thailand border
Hindu temples in Cambodia
Buildings and structures in Preah Vihear province
Dângrêk Mountains
World Heritage Sites in Cambodia
Archaeological sites in Cambodia
Cambodian refugees
Tourist attractions in Preah Vihear province
Demilitarized zones
Angkorian sites in Preah Vihear Province